Antimargarita powelli is a species of sea snail, a marine gastropod mollusk in the family Margaritidae.

Distribution
This marine species occurs in Antarctic waters in the Bellinghausen Sea.

References

 Engl W. (2012) Shells of Antarctica. Hackenheim: Conchbooks. 402 pp.

External links
 To Encyclopedia of Life
 To World Register of Marine Species

powelli
Gastropods described in 2009